Jessie Eden (née Shrimpton; 24 February 1902 – 27 September 1986) was a British trade union leader and communist activist, most famous for leading between 40,000 to 50,000 households during the Birmingham rent-strike of 1939. She was also involved in the construction of the Soviet Union's Moscow Metro, convincing women at Birmingham's Joseph Lucas motor factory to join the 1926 UK General Strike, and leading an unprecedented and successful strike of 10,000 factory worker women in 1931. For her commitment to helping improve the working conditions of English factory workers, she was awarded the T&G gold medal from Ernest Bevin. Later in life, she served for three decades as Birmingham city's federation of council house tenants. Her involvement in the trade unions of the English Midlands led to a massive increase in women joining British trade unions. She was a lifelong supporter of both the Transport and General Workers' Union (T&G), and of the Communist Party of Great Britain (CPGB) of which she was a leading member. 

In popular culture, she is best known for her depiction in the fictional British television series Peaky Blinders (played by Charlie Murphy), causing both controversies over how her personal life was portrayed and a renewed interest in British trade union history.

Early life 
Jessie Eden was born on 24 February 1902 at 61 Talbot Street, which was then listed as Birmingham's All Saints sub-district. Her mother was a 17-year-old suffrage campaigner also called Jessie, and her father was a "jeweller journeyman" called William. She grew up with her family in the Jewellery Quarter of Hockley, Birmingham. This district of Birmingham was close to the Lucas Electrics factory, where Eden later become a worker, and would become famous for due to her trade union activism. Jessie was the eldest of three daughters belonging to Jessie and William, the other two called May and Nell. By 1911 the family were living at 32 Court 2 House, Bridge Street, and her father now aged 27 was working as a "wireman".

A brief marriage in the summer of 1923 in Kings Norton to a man called Albert Eden would see Jessie change her last name from Shrimpton to Eden, the name for which she would become most known. Later in life, she described her short marriage to Albert Eden as a "folly", and that she was unsatisfied with being married to somebody who did not share her political beliefs. Despite the marriage's short length, the couple adopted a son called Douglas (Douggie to friends), however, his parental status is disputed and many members of Eden's family believe that Douglas was a blood relative of Jessie Eden (see Personal and Family Life).

Union leadership and political activism

1926 general strike 
Eden became a factory worker filling shock absorbers at Birmingham's Lucas Electronics factory and a union steward for the factory's only section of unionised women. During the 1926 United Kingdom general strike, she convinced these same unionised worker women to walk out of the factory and join the strike. Both of her parents were very supportive of her trade union activism, with her father joining her during the general strike and her mother hanging a red flag from their home's front window.

1931 Birmingham women's strike 
In 1931 Eden organised another strike, this time leading 10,000 non-unionised women on a week-long strike, during which she joined the Communist Party of Great Britain (CPGB). Before the strike, Eden had noticed that factory supervisors had been closely observing her work, and it was soon discovered by Eden and her fellow workers that the supervisors were monitoring her because she was a fast worker and that they planned to use her work speed as a standard for all the other workers in the factory. Eden approached the Amalgamated Engineering Union (AEU), however, they did not allow women to join their membership, so she instead approached the Transport and General Workers' Union (T&W). In protest to the factory's plans, Eden organised a mass walkout of 10,000 women, who refused to work for a week. The strike was successful and the Lucas Electrics factory management was forced to back down. After the victory, the overjoyed factory workers were so ecstatic that the factory could not function during normal hours and had to be closed early. One of the communist activists who had encouraged Eden was raised up upon the shoulders of factory workers at a dinner hour in celebration.

This strike was described by the Trades Union Congress (TUC) as "unprecedented at the time", and led to the T&G's leader (then Ernest Bevin) to award Jessie Eden with the union's Gold Medal. Eden's leadership and organisation of the strike prompted a massive increase in the number of women in the midlands joining British trade unions.

Life in the Soviet Union 
After the 1931 strike the Communist Party (of which she was a lifelong member) arranged for her to travel to the Soviet Union to help rally women workers to help build the Moscow Metro in 1934. She spent two and a half years in the Soviet Union, although despite her skills in worker organisation, her work did very little to speed up the progress of the Moscow Metro, due largely to language difficulties. During her time in the Soviet Union, she became involved with the Comintern's Lenin School, and was elected a Shock Worker at the Stalin automotive plant (later renamed the ZiL automotives).

Later in life, Eden told her daughter-in-law that she had travelled to the Soviet Union in secret, and that most people believed she had disappeared.

1939 Birmingham rent strike 
After returning from the Soviet Union, Eden again led another successful strike in the city of Birmingham. In 1939, as a protest against slum-like conditions of housing in the city of Birmingham, Eden organised a mass rent strike of nearly 50,000 tenants. She would continue her activism in the field of housing rights and spend nearly three decades as the leader of Birmingham city's federation of council house tenants.

Election campaigns 
Jessie contested the Handsworth constituency during the August 1945 general election, winning 3.4% (1,390) of the votes.

Later in November 1945, she took part as a candidate in the municipal elections, short of winning by 2,887 votes.

Appearance in Peaky Blinders 
Season 4 and 5 of Peaky Blinders introduced a character named Jessie Eden, portrayed by Irish actress Charlie Murphy. Although the reception was mixed, some people who had known Eden personally took offence to the way she was depicted. Graham Stevenson, a historian of British communism, a personal friend of Eden and the author of her biography, criticised the show."I knew Eden, and as a callow 22-year-old, I didn't ask the 70-year-old Jessie about her relationships, let alone sex life. But I doubt her private life was as complicated or dramatic as her eponymous character's. Nor can I see any young woman during the 1920s gratuitously going into a gents’ toilets, as Eden is shown doing, for any reason at all other than life or death. The social values of the programme are ahistorical. It is surely the conceit that Tommy Shelby, the gangster villain-hero of the series, could ever convince a woman like Eden to be wined and dined, let alone be seduced, that finally reveals the true motives of the creators of the programme."

At a round table event featuring Stevenson, poet Dave Puller, and cultural historian Professor Paul Long, the three discussed the series and its depictions of the British working class. Long rated the series positively and praised the series as a "great representation of interesting working-class protagonists". Puller had mixed feelings and was disappointed that the show chose to focus on Eden's fictional romance with Tommy Shelby, rather than her real achievements as a communist and a trade union leader.

Personal and family life 
Eden married twice, once briefly in 1923 to Albert Eden who she quickly broke up with, citing his differing political views. During this short marriage, the couple adopted a son called Douglas (Douggie to friends), who later joined the Royal Navy, and became a lifelong communist party member until he died in 1977. After his death, various members of the Eden family spoke of him as being a blood relative, and that Douglas had lived his entire life never knowing that he was not Jessie Eden's biological son.

In 1948 she married for a second and final time to fellow communist party activist Walter McCulloch, and they stayed together until his death in 1978. McCulloch was a carpenter and CPGB member who oversaw the construction of the communist party's Star Social Club for the Midlands branch.

Eden died in Birmingham on 27 September 1986.

See also 

 Claudia Jones
Dorothy Kuya
Mark Ashton
 Harry Pollitt
 Shapurji Saklatvala
 Alan Winnington

References 

1902 births
1987 deaths
People from Birmingham, West Midlands
British trade union leaders
Women trade unionists
English anti-fascists
International Lenin School alumni
Communist Party of Great Britain members
British expatriates in the Soviet Union
British feminists